Touch me not is a common name for two unrelated groups of plants:

Several species in the genus Impatiens (family Balsaminaceae)
Mimosa pudica (family Fabaceae)

Other uses
Touch-Me-Not (Bongseonhwa), a 1956 South Korean film directed by Kim Ki-young
Touch Me Not (Nu mă atinge), a 2018 film that won the Golden Bear at the Berlinale Berlin Film Festival
The biblical Latin phrase Noli me tangere which appears in John 20:17 can be translated as "Touch me not"